Worcester Racecourse is a thoroughbred horse racing venue located in the city of Worcester, Worcestershire, England. Horse racing has taken place here since at least 1718. It staged Flat racing until 1966 but has since staged National Hunt racing only.

It is popularly known by Worcester residents as 'Pitchcroft' and is just short of 100 acres. From 1893 the Worcester Rugby Club played on ground enclosed by the racecourse for a number of years.  In 1902 Berwick Rangers and Worcester Rovers football clubs amalgamated taking the present name of Worcester City F.C. playing on an enclosed area of the racecourse called Severn Terrace (behind the present Swan Theatre) until the start of the 1905 season.

The course is laid out as a left handed oval circuit of about 13 furlongs (approximately 2,615 metres) in length, with nine fences (five down the back straight and four in the home straight) and situated by the east bank of the River Severn and the north side of Worcester Bridge.

During the 2007 floods, the racecourse was inundated and all the fixtures after June 30 had to be cancelled.

References

External links
Official website
Course guide on GG.COM
Course guide on At The Races

Horse racing venues in England
Sports venues in Worcestershire
Sports venues completed in 1718
1718 establishments in England
Sport in Worcester, England